Nomima is a genus of moths in the Dudgeoneidae family.

Species
 Nomima chloroptera (Meyrick, 1920)
 Nomima cyanoscia (Meyrick, 1918)
 Nomima deserticola Mey, 2007
 Nomima gaerdesi Mey, 2007
 Nomima montisusti Mey, 2007
 Nomima prophanes Durrant, 1916
 Nomima subnigrata (Meyrick, 1917)
 Nomima szunyoghyi (Gozmány, 1965)

References

External links
Natural History Museum Lepidoptera generic names catalog

Dudgeoneidae